Devohn Noronha-Teixeira (born in Mississauga, Ontario) is a male field hockey player, who played for the Canada national field hockey team at the 2015 Pan American Games and won a silver medal.

In 2016, he was named to Canada's Olympic team.

References

External links
 
 
 
 

1989 births
Living people
Field hockey players at the 2015 Pan American Games
Canadian male field hockey players
Pan American Games silver medalists for Canada
Field hockey players at the 2016 Summer Olympics
Olympic field hockey players of Canada
Pan American Games medalists in field hockey
Sportspeople from Mississauga
Canadian people of Goan descent
Canadian sportspeople of Indian descent
Medalists at the 2015 Pan American Games
Male field hockey forwards